Dorados de Chihuahua (English: Chihuahua Goldens) are a refounded baseball team from the city of Chihuahua.  Recently, the Tuneros de San Luis moved to Chihuahua and took the Dorados namesake, which also brought the LMB (AAA) Mexican Baseball League to Chihuahua for the first time since 1982.  The Dorados played their home games at Estadio Chihuahua. The Dorados will be sold to either Nuevo Laredo or Aguascalientes for the 2011–2012 season.

Dorados de Chihuahua baseball history

Mexican League 1940
The Mexican League was founded in 1925 with 5 teams and slowly grew. By the late 1930s and 40s, the league was drawing the top players from the Negro leagues, including Satchel Paige, Cool Papa Bell, Martin Dihigo, Ray Dandridge and Willie Wells. Native Mexican talent was almost run out of the league in 1940, when many Cuban and Negro league stars took central stage – only a handful of Mexican players like Angel Castro and Jesus Valenzuela were competitive with the foreign imports. Three Negro leaguers won Triple Crowns in a 4-year period – since then only three other players have won Triple Crowns in the Mexican League. The Dorados de Chihuahua joined the Mexican League in 1940. The Golden men were 14-67 and 42 games out of first in dead last. The teams loan super stars were Lonnie Summers and Jacinto Roque, both of whom spent time on other clubs. The Dorados also played in the short-lived Mexican National League in 1946.

Arizona–Texas League 1952
Formed from the Arizona State League in 1931, the Arizona–Texas League was a class D circuit that ran from '31-'32 and '37-'39. In '40-'41 it was promoted to class C, then halted play from 1942 to 1946. In '47-'50 the league again organized and competed until 1951 when it merged with the Sunset League to form the Southwest International League. Chihuahua Dorados joined the league towards the end in 1952, winning 57 and losing 83, finishing 27 and 1/2 games out of first.  Though the team did not win as many games as expected, they drew an impressive 130,329 fans in 70 home games in 1952; out drawing every other team in the league by double.

The Central Mexican League 1956-57
The Central Mexican League was a class C operation which lasted two seasons, 1956 and 1957. The six-team circuit was very offense-friendly and ERAs over 8 were about as common as ERAs under 3.50. Both the City of Juarez and Chihuahua represented the state of Chihuahua Mexico.  In 1956 the great pitcher Marte de Alejandro propelled Chihuahua to a second-place finish behind the Saltillo Saraperos by only a half game, with an astounding 129 strikeouts and 18 victories in the short season of only 100 games.  Both teams had equal records on the last day of the season, yet a loss by Chihuahua and a forfeit by Saltillo's opponent gave the crown to the Saraperos.  Chihuahua's manager Manuel Arroyo was furious, and promised a local paper that the Dorados would win in 1957, which they did.  1957 marked the Gold men's first crown outright, posting a 62 and 38 record behind the great pitching of Antonio Dicochea, 17 wins and 157 Strikeouts.

Arizona–Mexico League 1958
In 1955 the Arizona–Texas League became the Arizona–Mexico League. The circuit continued only four more seasons before the class C league bid adieu to baseball. During these four seasons more than 1,700,000 fans went through the gate. The Cananea Mineros was the only team to win more than one league title, taking two back to back, in 1955 and 1956. They drew 347,247 fans those two years.  Chihuahua joined the league for its final year in 1958.  In 1958 the Dorados, skippered by Leonel Aldama, went 56 and 62 falling to fourth place, yet still leading the league in 58 with 59,917 fans in attendance.

Mexican League 1973–1982
Returning to the Mexican League in 1973, Chihuahua, now under the name Centauros de Chihuahua in relation to a nickname for Pancho Villa, went 527 and 776.  Never climbing above second place, the Centauros were a fan favorite drawing the most fans over the 10-year stretch.

Independent Semi Pro State Baseball 1985–2002
For much of the next 20 years Chihuahua was without a professional team, instead a sponsored independent city team was organized to play against other independent teams in the surrounding area.  Many college and high school players from the Texas-Louisiana league, along with stragglers form the now defunct Western League spent time playing among these teams gaining valuable experience and giving the crowds a great show.  Some of the greatest imports from the US during this time were: pitcher Duke Richards later with the Alexandria Aces 19 wins and 3 losses, catcher Moose Edmunds from the Bend Bandits, .329 avg with 15 home runs and 4 steals of home (two coming in one game), outfielder George Wallace Johnson Jr 62 Stolen Bases, and Tim Leone cut from the Edinburg Roadrunners, was a heavy hitting first baseman who clubbed an amazing 40 home runs in one season for Chihuahua.

Mexican League 2003–2010
2003 marked official talks and action to bring Chihuahua back into the LMB, along with its cousin Juarez.  In 2007 The Mexican League announced the San Luis Potosí Tuneros were moving to the city of Chihuahua, where the team became known as the Dorados. The Tuneros finished out of the playoffs in 2007 with an overall record of 49-61, which ranked 15th among 16 Liga teams in attendance. Just over 68,000 fans turned out for games in San Luis Potosí for an average of about 1,200 fans per game. Only the perpetually cash-strapped Campeche Piratas did worse at the gate. Although the Tuneros never won an LMB pennant in San Luis, the old Chihuahua Dorados failed to even make the Mexican League playoffs in twelve seasons in the 1970s and 1980s. The new Dorados featured such holdovers from the Tuneros as Sharnol Adriana, Darryl Brinkley and Pat O'Sullivan. 
As the Liga's most northwesterly city after Tijuana, the Dorados remained in the LMB Northern Division until 2010.

Managers
 1952         Domingo Santana and Marvin Williams.  
 1956–1957  Manuel Arroyo 
 1958         Leonel Aldama

References

Resources
 Chihuahua Dorados
 Baseball Almanac

Sports teams in Chihuahua City
Former Mexican League teams
Defunct Arizona-Texas League teams